Robideau may refer to:
Robert Robideau
Roubadeau Pass